;) is a song by Maltese singer Destiny Chukunyere that represented Malta in the Eurovision Song Contest 2021. The song was written and composed by Amanuel Dermont, Malin Christin, Nicklas Eklund and Pete Barringer.

Eurovision Song Contest

The song was selected to represent Malta in the Eurovision Song Contest 2021, after Destiny was internally selected by the national broadcaster. The semi-finals of the 2021 contest featured the same line-up of countries as determined by the draw for the 2020 contest's semi-finals. Malta was placed into the first semi-final, held on 18 May 2021, and performed in the second half of the show.

Release and promotion 
"Je me casse" was made available for digital download and streaming by Jagged House on 22 March 2021.

Charts

Release history

References

2021 singles
2021 songs
Eurovision songs of 2021
Eurovision songs of Malta
Songs with feminist themes
Destiny Chukunyere songs